Denys Ostapchenko (born 19 April 2001) is a Ukrainian Paralympic swimmer. He represented the Ukraine at the 2020 Summer Paralympics.

Career
Ostapchenko represented Ukraine in the 50 metre backstroke S3 event at the 2020 Summer Paralympics and won a silver medal. He also competed in the 50 metre freestyle S3 event and won a bronze medal. He then competed in the 200 metre freestyle S3 event and won a gold medal.

References

2001 births
Living people
Ukrainian male backstroke swimmers
People from Myrhorod
Paralympic swimmers of Ukraine
Medalists at the World Para Swimming European Championships
Medalists at the World Para Swimming Championships
Paralympic medalists in swimming
Paralympic gold medalists for Ukraine
Paralympic silver medalists for Ukraine
Paralympic bronze medalists for Ukraine
Swimmers at the 2020 Summer Paralympics
Medalists at the 2020 Summer Paralympics
Ukrainian male freestyle swimmers
S3-classified Paralympic swimmers
Sportspeople from Poltava Oblast
21st-century Ukrainian people